Guillermo del Toro's Cabinet of Curiosities (or simply Cabinet of Curiosities) is a horror anthology streaming television series created by Guillermo del Toro for Netflix. It features eight modern horror stories in the traditions of the Gothic and Grand Guignol genres. Two are co-written by del Toro himself, while the others are written and directed by various filmmakers. It premiered on October 25, 2022, and received generally positive reviews.

Premise
The series is "a collection of the Oscar-winning filmmaker's personally curated stories, described as [equally] sophisticated and horrific." Del Toro introduces each episode.

Production

Development

On May 14, 2018, it was announced that Netflix had given the production a series order. Executive producers included Guillermo del Toro, J. Miles Dale, and Gary Ungar. Del Toro also served as writer for one episode and handpicked other writers and directors to helm other episodes.

In September 2021, The Hollywood Reporter announced that The Babadook filmmaker Jennifer Kent would write and direct an episode starring the film's lead Essie Davis. The season would consist of seven other episodes, to be directed individually by Ana Lily Amirpour, Panos Cosmatos, Catherine Hardwicke, Guillermo Navarro, David Prior, Vincenzo Natali, and Keith Thomas, with writers such as Regina Corrado, Lee Patterson, Haley Z. Boston, Mika Watkins, and Aaron Stewart-Ahn. The series was described as "in production", according to The Hollywood Reporter.

Filming
Principal photography of the series began under the working title Guillermo del Toro Presents: 10 After Midnight on June 28, 2021 in Toronto and Hamilton, Ontario, Canada, and concluded on February 16, 2022.

Episodes

Reception
The review aggregator website Rotten Tomatoes reports that 94% of 47 surveyed critics gave the series a positive review; the average rating is 7.6/10. The website's critics consensus reads, "Horror maestro Guillermo del Toro lends his household name to a collection of spooky tales directed by genre veterans and promising newcomers—with each curious trinket adding up to a treasure trove of gothic storytelling." Metacritic, which uses a weighted average, assigned a score of 73 out of 100 based on 21 critics, indicating "generally favorable reviews".

Accolades

Notes

References

External links
 
 

2020s American anthology television series
2020s American horror television series
2022 American television series debuts
Mexican anthology television series
English-language Netflix original programming
Horror anthologies
Television shows directed by David Prior
Works by Guillermo del Toro
Adaptations of works by H. P. Lovecraft